Ready for Boarding is a live album by German heavy metal band Running Wild. It was recorded at a concert in Munich, Germany. The song "Purgatory" has never been recorded for a studio album and is dedicated to the Parents Music Resource Center.

Track listing

Personnel
 Rolf Kasparek – guitar, vocals
 Majk Moti – guitar, backing vocals
 Jens Becker – bass, backing vocals
 Stefan Schwarzmann – drums

Production
 Irene Vögeli – photography

Charts

References

Running Wild (band) albums
1988 live albums
Noise Records live albums